Mount Saint Thomas is a suburb of Wollongong in New South Wales, lying east of Figtree and South west of Wollongong.

During World War II, the Drummond Battery was constructed in the suburb as part of the defences for Port Kembla.

References

Suburbs of Wollongong